Seyyedabad (also Romanized as Seyyedābād) is a village in Sorkhkola Rural District, in the Central District of Savadkuh County, Mazandaran Province, Iran. At the 2006 census, its population was 46, in 12 families.

References 

Populated places in Savadkuh County